Tomoko Takahashi (born 7 April 1997) is a Japanese professional footballer who plays as a goalkeeper for WE League club Albirex Niigata Ladies.

Club career 
Takahashi made her WE League debut on 17 October 2021.

References 

Living people
1997 births
Women's association football goalkeepers
WE League players
Japanese women's footballers
Albirex Niigata Ladies players
Association football people from Niigata Prefecture